Four male athletes from Cyprus competed at the 1996 Summer Paralympics in Atlanta, United States.

See also
Cyprus at the Paralympics
Cyprus at the 1996 Summer Olympics

References 

Nations at the 1996 Summer Paralympics
1996
Summer Paralympics